Paradise Furnace, also known as Mary Anne Furnace, is a national historic district located in Trough Creek State Park at Todd Township in Huntingdon County, Pennsylvania. It consists of two contributing buildings and one contributing structure associated with a former iron furnace.  They are the ironmaster's mansion, furnace stack, and a log workers' house.  The ironmaster's mansion was built in the 1830s, and is a 2 1/2-story stone house in the Georgian plan. The furnace stack dates to the 1830s, and is a 28-foot square, coursed rubble stone structure. It measures between 15 and 20 feet tall. The ironworks operated from the late-18th century into the 1860s, when economic conditions caused it to be fired.  The two-story log house dates to the late-18th century. It was converted for use as the park visitor's center / museum in 1982.

It was listed on the National Register of Historic Places in 1990.

References 

Industrial buildings and structures on the National Register of Historic Places in Pennsylvania
Historic districts on the National Register of Historic Places in Pennsylvania
Buildings and structures in Huntingdon County, Pennsylvania
National Register of Historic Places in Huntingdon County, Pennsylvania
1830s establishments in Pennsylvania